Horcotes is a genus of dwarf spiders that was first described by C. R. Crosby & S. C. Bishop in 1933.  it contains only three species, found in Canada, Russia, and the United States: H. quadricristatus, H. strandi, and H. uncinatus.

See also
 List of Linyphiidae species (A–H)

References

Araneomorphae genera
Linyphiidae
Spiders of North America
Spiders of Russia